The Army Cadet Force (ACF), generally shortened to Army Cadets, is a national youth organisation sponsored by the United Kingdom's Ministry of Defence and the British Army. Along with the Sea Cadet Corps and the Air Training Corps, the ACF make up the Community Cadet Forces. It is a separate organisation from the Combined Cadet Force which provides similar training within principally private schools.

Although sponsored by the Ministry of Defence, the ACF is not part of the British Army, and as such cadets are not subject to military 'call up'. Some cadets do, however, go on to enlist in the armed forces later in life.

The Army Cadet Force Association (ACFA) is a registered charity that acts in an advisory role to the Ministry of Defence and other Government bodies on matters connected with the ACF. The Army Cadets is also a member of The National Council for Voluntary Youth Services (NCVYS), as an organisation with a voluntary and community youth focus.

As of 1 April 2022, there are 33,300 cadets, and 8,100 Cadet Force Adult Volunteers (CFAVs).

History 
In 1859 the British Army was heavily committed to suppressing the Indian Mutiny which left a shortage of Armed Troops in Britain to dissuade or repel a French invasion which at the time was a very real threat. At this time the War Office made the decision to organize local Militia units (predecessors of the Territorial Army), into a nationwide Volunteer Reserve Force which it names "the Volunteers". A number of these Volunteers formed their own Cadet Companies, and during the 1860 Volunteer review by Queen Victoria one unit - the Queen's Westminster's - paraded their Cadet Company alongside their adult Companies. At this time some public schools had started to form independent cadet units, and at least eight are known to have been in existence at this point (fore-runners of the Combined Cadet Force).

In 1889 renowned social reformer Miss Octavia Hill formed the first independent Cadet Battalion in Southwark. Octavia Hill considered strongly that the military context of the Volunteer Cadet Companies could be used to socialise urban youths struggling for direction, and wrote that "There is no organisation which I have found that influences the boys so powerfully for good as our cadets ... and if such ideals can be brought before the young lad before he gets in with a gang of loafers it may make all the difference to his life". At this time recruitment for the Cadet Forces was limited to young men "who had passed the age of make-believe"; Hill invited a serving officer of the Derbyshire Regiment to set up the company, and such was its popularity that its numbers had to be capped at 160 cadets.

The late Victorian period was when the time of social change began to take hold in Britain and Adam Gray - who was considered to be a pioneer in Social Work - founded Independent Cadet Corps units. The formation of Cadet units also spread to the colonies. The Bermuda Cadet Corps was formed at the turn of the Century with detachments in the schools of the British Army's Bermuda Garrison and the Royal Navy's dockyard, as well as a handful of civilian schools; its cadets wore the cap badge of the Bermuda Volunteer Rifle Corps, to which the Bermuda Cadet Corps was attached.

In 1908, when the Territorial Force was formed, both the Volunteer and Independent Cadet Companies came under the control of the Territorial Forces Association under the new name of the Cadet Force, whilst the Public School units were part of the Officer Training Corps.

In 1914 at the onset of World War I there was a massive expansion of the Cadet Force; at this time the War Office took back control of the organisation and administration of all Cadet Forces from their Territorial Associations and once again integrated the units into the central war effort.

During World War I, the War Office extended the earning of Certificate "A", which with Certificate "B", had been used by the OTCs (Officer Training Corps), to the Cadets. This became the goal for most Cadets until the Army Proficiency Certificate tests were introduced. The tests covered many aspects of infantry training, including drill, map reading, weapon training and shooting, fieldcraft (also known as Battle-drill), fitness, and command instruction.

The award of the certificate permitted the holder to wear a four-pointed star (red with khaki edgings) on the lower sleeve. A technical certificate (Certificate "T") was also developed, in 1943, covering engineering knowledge. The award of this gave another four-pointed star, but with the centre in blue. The holder of a Certificate "T" was assured entry into one of the technical corps (RE, RAOC, or REME) on being called up. A Certificate "A" holder was given a shorter training period.

In 1923, as a result of defence cut-backs, all governmental and military support for the Cadet Force was withdrawn, and Cadets were prohibited from wearing regimental insignia, buttons, or badges. This led to the forming of the British National Cadet Association (BNCA) by notable figures such as Lord Allenby who were keen to ensure the survival of the Cadet Force, and who lobbied the Government for both support and funding. This was partially successful during the 1930s, and in 1932 the BNCA was permitted to run the Cadet Force under the guidance of the Territorial Associations.

At the onset of World War II the Cadet Forces supported the Home Guard at a time when there was a significant threat of German invasion; this led to the War Office in 1942 re-assuming administration of Cadet Forces, which at this time consisted of the Cadet Force, Sea Cadet Corps (SCC), and the Air Training Corps (ATC) (named in 1941). When it resumed administration in 1942, the title Army Cadet Force (ACF) was bestowed upon the Cadet Force, leading in 1945 to the BNCA changing its name to the Army Cadet Force Association (ACFA). This organisation is a registered charity and plays a vital role in the life of the ACF to this day. In 1948 those elements of the Army Cadet Force that came under School administration (approximately 100 units) were split from the ACF and were granted the title Combined Cadet Force (CCF).

In 1956, with World War II over and with National Service coming to an end, the government set up the Amery Committee to report on the future organisation and training of Cadets. Citizenship training was one of the needs and main benefits identified. During this period all Cadet organisations, including the ACF, participated in a pilot scheme for The Duke of Edinburgh's Award; to date it remains one of the UK's largest operating authorities of the Award.

Following the publication of the Amery Report by the government in 1957, the ACF assumed its role as a national youth organisation sponsored by the War Office. This sponsorship remains in place - however, current sponsorship is provided by the Ministry of Defence (MoD), as the War Office was renamed in 1967.

In 1959, also as a result of the Amery Report, a centralized Cadet Training Centre was established at Frimley Park, which remains the home of the Cadet Forces.

In 1960 the ACF celebrated its 100th anniversary with a review of the ACF and CCF in the grounds of Buckingham Palace by Her Majesty Queen Elizabeth II and His Royal Highness Prince Philip the Duke of Edinburgh. At this time the Duke of Edinburgh presented a banner to the ACF.

Prior to 1982, females were unable to join the ACF, though they were able to join an attached unit (if there was one at that location) of the Girls Venture Corps which had been formed in the early years of the Second World War. Female instructors and cadets were formally enrolled into the ACF following numerous pilot schemes over several years; this led to the introduction of the ACF APC Syllabus in 1990, which noticeably dropped the requirement for hand-to-hand combat and included a major overhaul of instruction, tactics, and subjects. Today nearly 30% of Army Cadets are girls.

In 2010 the Cadet movement celebrated its 150th anniversary with over 150 events in communities up and down the country, and beyond, under the banner of Cadet 150. The main ceremonial event took place on 6 July 2010, when over 1,700 Cadets and adult volunteers paraded down the Mall for inspection by His Royal Highness, Charles the Prince of Wales before joining friends, family, and VIP guests at a garden party in the grounds of Buckingham Palace.

In 2018, after the theft of three Drill Purpose L103A2 rifles (modified SA80 assault rifles) from an Army Cadet Hall in Newport-on-Tay Drill purpose rifles have been taken into quarantine by the MOD; it was realised during the ensuing police investigation that the Drill Purpose rifles could be modified to fire live rounds.

Investigation into sexual abuse 
In 2012 payouts made to victims of sexual abuse across all Cadet Forces totaled £1,475,844. In 2013 payouts totaled £64,782, and in 2014 payouts totaled £544,213.

In 2017, a BBC Panorama episode entitled "Cadet Abuse Cover-Up" highlighted sexual abuse cases in the British Cadet Forces. In the years 2012 to 2017 there were 201 allegations of sexual abuse made against ACF volunteers, including historical allegations. 158 cases were referred to the Police for investigation, and 62 offenders were dismissed.

Structure and organisation 

Most British counties have centralised cadet forces that make up the ACF as a national whole. The counties are generally split into companies, each of which includes several detachments, the name given to a unit of cadets that parade in a particular town or village. Some battalions or Counties are affiliated with a certain Regiment or Corps within the British Army, and wear their insignia including cap badge, colour of beret and stable belt subject to individual County/Area regulations. In other battalions or counties each detachment is individually affiliated to a Regiment or Corps within the British Army. Detachments are usually called by the name of the place in which they are based or those attached to schools may use the name of the school.

Cadet Force Adult Volunteers 
Adults may join the ACF to instruct through two different routes – as an Adult Instructor (AI) or as a Commissioned Officer.

Adult Instructors 
Prospective Adult Instructors begin as a Civilian Assistant (CA) before passing an enhanced disclosure. After completing the Familiarization and Assessment weekend (F&A) and Basic Induction Course (BIC), which takes place over 4 weekends at county level, they then become a Probationary Instructor (PI). As a PI, adults then go on to complete the Intermediate Instructors Course (IIC) at county level held over 3 weekends and the Advanced Instructors Course (AIC) held over one week at brigade level and run by a Cadet Training Team (CTT). On successful completion of this course they will be appointed to the rank of Sergeant Instructor (SI). Progressive training takes place for Adult Instructors, as with cadets, an Adult Instructor may take part in a variety of different courses. An example of a further course which takes place at CTC Frimley Park is the Adult Leadership and Management Course. On successful completion of a course like this (which demonstrates the ability to plan and manage detachment level training) an AI is eligible for promotion to the rank of Staff Sergeant Instructor (SSI). The Exercise Conducting Officer's (ECO) and Cadet Drill instructor Course (CADIC) are also available to AIs and the further ranks of Sergeant Major Instructor (SMI) and Regimental Sergeant Major Instructor (RSMI) are possible on completion of the King George VI course. Adult Instructors will be expected to work in a team with their superiors and senior cadets they are responsible for, to deliver effective training to the cadets.

Officers 
The other route a Cadet Force Adult Volunteer (CFAV) in the ACF may take is that of becoming a commissioned officer. The CFAV will apply and partake in the same selection process as above, however once a Probationary Instructor, the individual may apply or be nominated to become a commissioned officer. To do so, as of 2006, the individual must then attend a Cadet Forces Commissions Board (CFCB), similar to an Army Officer Selection Board though less physically demanding. The applicant will be assessed on their literacy, problem solving, and leadership ability. Successful applicants will then be appointed to a Cadet Forces Commission, which replaced the previous Army Reserve General List Group B commission in 2017. Commissioned Officers in the ACF will hold senior leadership roles with more responsibility and commitment attached than roles occupied by Adult Instructors, for example detachment commander or within their Company HQs.

Staff costs 
The Cadet Force is one of the few voluntary organisations that pays its volunteer staff for their time. These staff can receive up to 28 days pay per year, 19 as of November 2021, they also receive subsistence and travel expenses for attendance on evenings, weekends and annual camps. In 2009/10 pay bill for ACF part-time staff was £14,632,160 and their expenses totalled £368,349. The cost of full-time staff was estimated at around a further £6,250,000 of public funds.

Safeguarding 
Like most organisations involving young people, all adult volunteers are required to undergo a Disclosure and Barring Service (DBS) check before having unsupervised contact with cadets. They must also receive safeguarding training when joining and must receive update training every 12 months. All ACF counties have a Training Safety Advisor (TSA) who is responsible for reviewing the safety aspects of all training.

Activities

Army Cadet Syllabus 

Army Cadet Syllabus [ACS] (the army cadet syllabus brought about in June 2022) is the training syllabus of the ACF and is divided into five levels each covering the core subjects but in more detail as they progress.
 Basic/Recruit (introductory training)
 1 Star (cadets learn the rudiments of each subject)
 2 Star (cadets learn each subject in more depth)
 3 Star (cadets master each subject)
 4 Star (complete two progressive subjects or courses)
 Master Cadet (cadets must successfully complete the Master Cadet Course held at CTC Frimley following a recommendation from their Cadet Commandant). Cadets must have passed SCIC and 4 Star Fieldcraft before attempting the Master Cadet course.

Core subjects 

 Drill and Turnout
 Military Knowledge
 Fieldcraft
 Skill at Arms
 Shooting
 Navigation
 Expedition Training
 First Aid
 Physical Training
 Cadet in the Community

Drill and turnout 

Cadets are taught a subset of the drill movements taught to the regular army. They begin by learning basic foot drill and progress to learn rifle drill and banner drill. They are also taught how to wear and service their issued uniform.

Fieldcraft 
In fieldcraft lessons, cadets learn infantry skills such as patrolling, section battle drills, ambush drills, harbour drills, and how to survive in the field. Field exercises take place once every few months, and at annual camp. On exercise, cadets wear Multi-Terrain Pattern camouflage clothing, camouflage cream to eliminate the face's natural shine, a bush hat and foliage to break up the shape of the head and shoulders, a Cadet Training Vest or PLCE webbing to carry rifle magazines, water bottles and emergency rations, and a bergen to carry a sleeping bag and basha (improvised shelter) building materials. Cadets are issued with 24-hour ration packs (or known as rat packs to cadets) and dragon fire cookers as used by the infantry. As part of a platoon, cadets set up harbour areas (operations bases), post sentries, and send out patrols to carry out reconnaissance, lay ambushes, and assault enemy positions. Cadets become familiar with hand signals for silent communication, and patrol formations for crossing different types of terrain. Scaled down versions of these expeditions are regularly held at a local detachments.

Skill at Arms 

The primary weapon of the cadet forces is the L98A2 Cadet GP Rifle this is a cadet specific version of the British Armed Forces' L85A2 SA80 which has been adapted to fire only on repetition (semi-automatic) and therefore does not have a change lever, the weapon system is chambered in the NATO 5.56x45mm cartridge. In order to become proficient in this weapon system and pass the one-star Skill at Arms (SAA) test, cadets must show they can handle the weapon safely, perform stoppage drills, and field strip the weapon for daily cleaning, in addition to passing one-star Skill at Arms the cadet also receives a Weapon Handling Test (WHT) pass which must be re-qualified every 6 months. Once a cadet has an in date WHT, cadets can fire the weapon using blank rounds in field exercises using the Safe Blank Firing System (SBFS) and with live rounds on a range possibly gaining marksman qualification badges based on their accuracy. There is also a non-firing training version of the GP Rifle, the L103A2 DP (Drill Purpose), this is generally used for teaching cadets the basics of the weapon they are handling and for rifle drill. The L98A2 Cadet GP Rifle is also capable of being fitted with the British Army L41A1 sub-calibre adaptor which enables the weapon to fire .22 rimfire ammunition.

In addition to the L98A2, the cadet forces also use a number of weapons to foster and develop marksmanship and competitive shooting, the largest of these being the L81A2 Cadet Target Rifle which is a cadet version of the Parker-Hale M82. This weapon is chambered in 7.62x51mm NATO. In 2015 the cadet forces made the decision to start retirement and decommissioning of the No.8 rifle, this was replaced after trials and selection by the L144A1 Cadet Small Bore Target Rifle (CSBTR) manufactured by Savage Arms and rolled out gradually to Counties and Contingents. Cadet forces also use the BSA .177 Scorpion Cadet Air Rifle as an introductory weapon to develop marksmanship, these were purchased and delivered to Cadet units by the ACFA to replace aging .177 El gamo air rifles.

Cadets can enter various shooting competitions, including the ACF Cadet 100 .22 Rifle Competition and the CCRS Country Life (Green Howards) Small-bore .22 Rifle Competition.

Navigation 
Cadets learn how to navigate using a map and compass. Cadets learn to use Ordnance Survey maps plot and find six-figure grid references, calculate distances between points, and to recognise various conventional signs. The two-star map and compass course then introduces cadets to the Silva (Expedition 4) and Suunto (M-5N) lightweight protractor compasses. Cadets learn to use and plot grid and magnetic bearings to understand the three different types of north, to account for deviation of the grid-magnetic angle, to understand contour lines and more advanced conventional signs and the preparation of route cards. Once cadets are experienced in Map and Compass, they are taught how to lead expeditions, which also included their knowledge of fieldcraft.

First aid 
As part of the training syllabus Cadets are taught First Aid to recognised standards and are awarded relevant certificates. The syllabus is broadly based on the St John Ambulance Activity First Aid syllabus, working at the following levels.

 Basic complete the British Heart Foundation "Heartstart" course and learn basic incident management.
 One Star Cadets build on the knowledge gained at basic level and learn how to deal with other minor injuries.
 Two Star Cadets are required to complete the St John Ambulance Youth First Aid certificate Course
 Three Star Cadets have to complete the first day of the St John Ambulance Activity First Aid Certificate Course
 Four Star Cadets may choose to complete first aid as one of their progressive subjects. This includes passing the full Activity First Aid Course and completing practical work within their county such as training other cadets for APC awards or competitions.

Cadet in the community 

These community projects enrich local knowledge and encourage good citizenship, usually a cadet can contribute to their community by charity collection, public parades, assisting local services and helping at public events. This involvement within the community is important for improving confidence and social skills.

Duke of Edinburgh's Award 

The Duke of Edinburgh's Award is a voluntary, non-competitive programme of practical, cultural and adventurous activities for young people aged 14–25 (year 9, if they're a cadet). A young person can undertake a DofE programme at three levels, Bronze (year 9), Silver (year 10) and Gold (16+). Each have differing criteria for entry and the level of commitment necessary to gain each award. Cadets who meet the age criteria can become DofE participants and work towards their own DofE Award.

Cadets are often encouraged to achieve the Bronze, Silver and Gold awards as they progress through their cadet careers. Many cadet force activities can count towards each level of a participants' DofE programme and very often gets them recognition for developing skills and giving to their communities. The DofE is widely recognised by employers as it helps demonstrate that young people who hold a Duke of Edinburgh's are keen to take on new challenges, have a higher level of self-confidence than their counterparts and have leadership qualities with the added experience of teamwork.

Many detachments hold charity events, and participate in various activities such as tree planting, or carrying their standards at a Remembrance Parade in their local area.

Leadership training 
Leadership training is an important part of the ACF training programme, with training available at higher levels too. Most areas run NCO courses, designed to help newly promoted NCOs to perform their duties well, or to train those eligible for promotion. There are also a number of courses run centrally by the ACF. This includes the Junior Cadet Instructors Cadre (run locally at a county level) and the Senior Cadet Instructors Course which is run at a Brigade level by Cadet Training Teams.

Master Cadet Course 
The Master Cadet Course was introduced in 1989 to advance to the leadership, instructional and administrative abilities of post 4-star cadets. It is held at Cadet Training Centre Frimley Park in Surrey. Passing both this course and the Senior Cadet Instructors' Cadre makes the candidate eligible to be appointed as a Master Cadet.

The following criteria must be met to be eligible for the course:
 Aged 16 years old or older
 Hold the rank of sergeant or above
 Have passed fieldcraft as a progressive subject at 4-star level

Cadet Leadership Courses 
The Aim of the Cadet Leadership Courses (CLC) is:
To develop cadets' initiative and self-reliance and to exercise them in the problems of practical leadership.

The course is open to members of all the Cadet Forces (SCC, ACF, ATC and CCF) providing they are over 16 and have passed their APC 3 star or equivalent. Each Course has 120 places and is focused on leadership training and assessment, which is developed through a variety of activities including:
 Minor Tactics
 Watermanship Training
 Command Tasks
 Sport
 Skill-at-Arms
 Endurance Training

The courses are run by Brigade Cadet Training Teams at varying locations every year, usually at Easter and Autumn half term.

Optional subjects

Communications & Information Systems 
Communications & Information Systems (CIS) is the new name for the signals training in the ACF. Cadets learn about the history of signalling, how to send messages over radios and how to erect masts. They are trained on the following radios:

 PRC 343 PRR
 PRC 710
 PRC 715
 PRC 720

There are also other courses available including things such as Cyber Security.

Uniform 

All Cadets and CFAVs are issued with Personal Clothing System Combat Uniform (PCS-CU) in Multi-Terrain Pattern (MTP). Cadets are scaled to receive the following:
 Headdress (depends on regimental affiliation) – Beret, Tam o' Shanter, Glengarry or Caubeen
 Two PCS Lightweight Jackets
 Two pairs of PCS trousers
 PCS Windproof Smock
 Thermal Undershirt
 Two PCS T-shirts
 Working Belt
 two pairs of woolly socks

Some counties may charge a small deposit for uniform that is refundable on its return. All CFAVs must have "ACF" visible at all times on their uniform and cadets wear rank slides titled "CADET". Boots must be purchased by the cadet or their parents if not supplied.

The ACF has its own stable belt which can be worn by cadets and instructors, but they can also wear the stable belt of their affiliated regiment/corps. Stable belts can be worn by cadets of any rank but many counties impose local requirements such as star level or rank. They may be issued at the expense of the detachment or company but are usually a private purchase item.

Tactical Recognition Flashes are not to be worn by Cadet Force Adult Volunteers (CFAVs) or cadets irrespective of any affiliation to a Corps or Regiment. Cadets and CFAVs do wear county and contingent flashes of the Army Cadet Force.

Mayor's Cadet 
Some mayors appoint a member of the cadet forces to the role of Mayor's Cadet. The cadet may wear a special badge or carry a pace stick to indicate their role.

Lord Lieutenant's Cadet 
Cadets can be appointed to this role and are then entitled to wear the Lord Lieutenant's Cadet badge as well as issue Number 2 Dress.

Ranks 

Ranks in the ACF follow the pattern of those in the British Army.

Cadet ranks 
As well as learning new skills by working through the APC syllabus, experienced cadets can be awarded a rank. As the Army allows its soldiers to take on responsibility and leadership as non-commissioned officers (NCOs), so too does the ACF.

Cadet NCOs wear the issued cadet rank slides, pictured above. The titles of some ranks may vary as cadet detachments are affiliated to Army regiments and adopt their terminology. There is usually only one Cadet RSM per county or sector.

Although promotion is based on merit rather than progression through the APC syllabus, the following criteria must be met before a cadet is eligible for promotion:
 Cadet Lance Corporal – Passed APC 1 Star
 Cadet Corporal – Passed APC 2 Star
 Cadet Sergeant – Passed APC 3 Star and the JCIC course
 Cadet Staff/Colour Sergeant – Passed APC 4 Star and the SCIC course
 Cadet Sergeant Major/Company Sergeant Major – Passed APC 4 Star and the SCIC course
 Cadet Regimental Sergeant Major – Passed Master Cadet and the SCIC course
 Cadet Under Officer – Passed Master Cadet and the SCIC course

In some instances, cadets that do not meet the requirements for these ranks can be promoted with the agreement of the ACF Cadet Commandant.

Staff cadets 
From 2020 cadets who are over the age of 18, have completed APC 3-Star and hold the rank of Sergeant or above can become a "Staff Cadet". These cadets wear a rank slide with the words 'STAFF CADET' embroidered above their rank insignia. A staff cadet can remain a cadet until their 20th birthday.

CFAV ranks 
The adults who help to run the ACF are collectively known as Cadet Force Adult Volunteers (CFAVs). CFAVs wear the badges of rank as worn by Army NCOs with the addition of the letters ACF under the badge.

Officer ranks

National Honorary Colonel 
In November 2019, Lorraine Kelly was appointed the first National Honorary Colonel of the Army Cadet Force.

See also 
Other elements of the Community Cadet Forces
 Sea Cadet Corps
 Royal Marines Cadets
 Air Training Corps
Other MoD sponsored cadet forces
 Combined Cadet Force
 Volunteer Cadet Corps
Other Army Cadet organisations
 Australian Army Cadets 
 Bermuda Cadet Corps
 Royal Canadian Army Cadets
 Hong Kong Adventure Corps
 New Zealand Cadet Corps
Related articles
 Reserve Forces and Cadets Association
 Cadet Vocational Qualification Organisation (CVQO)
 National Association of Training Corps for Girls

References

External links 

 Army Cadets on British Army website
 Army Cadet Force official website (armycadets.com)
 Regulations

Army cadet organisations
British Cadet organisations
1860 establishments in the United Kingdom
Youth organizations established in 1860